The Comedian's Guide to Survival is a 2016 British-Canadian comedy film written by James Mullinger and Mark Murphy and starring James Buckley.

Cast

 James Buckley as James Mullinger
 Myanna Buring as Nell
 Paul Kaye as Phillip
 Neil Stuke as Adam
 Vas Blackwood as Dustin
 Natalie Stone as Olivia
 Clair Buckley as Pam
 Kevin Eldon as Nick Secker
 Peter Woodward as Morris
 Jalaal Hartley as Lance
 Richard Sandling as Richard
 James Mullinger as Brad Macey
 Mark Heap as Pick Up Driver
 Adrian Bouchet as Fox and Hounds Landlord
 Jimmy Carr as himself
 Gilbert Gottfried as himself
 Omid Djalili as himself
 Luenell as herself
 Mike Wilmot as himself
 Gina Yashere as herself
 Brendon Burns as himself
 Mike Ward as himself

Production
Principal photography for The Comedian's Guide to Survival took place in London in August 2015, following filming at Just For Laughs in Montreal, Quebec, Canada in July 2015. There was also additional filming in Hampshire, England.

References

External links
 
 

2016 films
2010s coming-of-age comedy films
British coming-of-age comedy films
2016 comedy films
2010s English-language films
2010s British films